Perkele is a Finnish profanity

Perkele may also refer to:

Perkele (band), a Swedish Oi! band